Yevgeni Valeryevich Chupin (born 24 October 1980) is a former Russian professional football player.

Club career
He made his Russian Football National League debut for FC Lisma-Mordovia Saransk on 29 March 2003 in a game against FC Khimki.

Personal life
He is a son of a former player and coach Valeri Chupin. His son, also named Valeri Chupin, is a footballer as well.

External links
 

1980 births
Living people
Russian footballers
Association football defenders
FC Energiya Volzhsky players
FC Neftyanik Ufa players
FC Sokol Saratov players
FC Gornyak Uchaly players
FC Mordovia Saransk players
FC Zenit-Izhevsk players
FC Sheksna Cherepovets players
FC Volga Ulyanovsk players
FC Spartak Nizhny Novgorod players